is a Japanese light novel series written by Kei Sazane and illustrated by Toiro Tomose. It began serialization online in September 2020 on Kadokawa's user-generated novel publishing website Kakuyomu. It was later published by Media Factory with six volumes since January 2021 under their MF Bunko J imprint. A manga adaptation with art by Kapiko Toriumi has been serialized in Media Factory's seinen manga magazine Monthly Comic Alive since August 2021. It has been collected in a single tankōbon volume. An anime television series adaptation by Liden Films has been announced.

Media

Light novel
The series written by Kei Sazane began serialization online in September 2020 on Kadokawa's user-generated novel publishing website Kakuyomu. It was later published as a light novel with illustrations by Toiro Tomose by Media Factory under their MF Bunko J imprint from January 25, 2021. As of January 2023, six volumes have been released.

At Sakura-Con 2022, Yen Press announced that they licensed the series for English publication.

Manga
A manga adaptation with art by Kapiko Toriumi began serialization in Media Factory's seinen manga magazine Monthly Comic Alive on August 27, 2021. It has been collected in a single tankōbon volume.

Anime
On January 21, 2022, an anime adaptation was announced with a promotional video narrated by Saki Miyashita. On July 24, 2022, during the "Natsu no Gakuensai 2022" event for MF Bunko J, it was announced that the anime will be a television series produced by Liden Films and directed by Tatsuya Shiraishi, with NTL writing the scripts.

See also
 Our Last Crusade or the Rise of a New World — Another light novel series by the same author.

References

External links
  at Kakuyomu 
  
 

2021 Japanese novels
Anime and manga based on light novels
Kadokawa Dwango franchises
Liden Films
Light novels
Light novels first published online
Media Factory manga
MF Bunko J
Seinen manga
Upcoming anime television series
Yen Press titles